The Lied von der blauen Fahne (Song of the Blue Flag) was an East German propaganda song written by Johannes R. Becher and set to music by Hanns Eisler.

History 
When, in 1949, the German Democratic Republic was founded in the aftermath of the second world war, German communists sought to boost the picture of the GDR being the first anti-Fascist state on German soil. Unlike West Germany, the GDR never recognized its responsibility for the atrocities committed by the Third Reich as it regarded itself as a new socialist national entity that had defeated National Socialism.

This official state myth thus enabled the growth of a strong patriotism in the east whereas the FRG had and still has a difficult relationship to its own national identity.

As the GDR still wanted to reunify Germany in its early years, patriotic and propaganda songs constantly mentioned the country as a whole. Especially in the 1950s, patriotic songs praising Germany, German unity and the future of a new, democratic nation were produced and promoted by the GDR government, the socialist party and its sub-organizations.

One of these songs was the Song of the Blue Flag which referred to the flag of the party's youth organisation, the Freie Deutsche Jugend. Its authors, Hanns Eisler and Johannes R. Becher, had also written East Germany's national anthem and other patriotic songs.

The official attitude of the socialist government towards Germany changed in 1974 when the constitution was modified and all passages referring to the country as a whole or the GDR as a "socialist state of the German nation" were effaced. Hence, the lyrics of the national anthem exalting "Germany, our united fatherland" fell out of use, too, as did all songs about a united Germany thad had hitherto been sung.

Lyrics

See also 
 Auferstanden aus Ruinen
 Children's Hymn

References

External links 
 Lied von der blauen Fahne on YouTube.

German patriotic songs
East Germany